Indian Weightlifting Federation otherwise known as IWLF, is the national governing body overseeing the sport of weightlifting in India. The headquarters of the Indian Weightlifting Federation is in New Delhi. The Federation is affiliated to the Indian Olympic Association, New Delhi and is a member of Asian Weightlifting Federation, Tehran and International Weightlifting Federation, Budapest. The present president of IWLF is Sahdev Yadav and the General Secretary of Indian Weightlifting Federation is Anande Gowda.

National events 
 Youth
 Junior
 Senior

Weightlifting in India

References 

Weightlifting in India
Sports governing bodies in India
Year of establishment missing
Organisations based in Delhi